That's Why I'm Here is the eleventh studio album by singer-songwriter James Taylor released in 1985, four years after his previous effort, Dad Loves His Work. The album contains a version of Buddy Holly's "Everyday", as well as the participation of several singers, including Don Henley, Joni Mitchell, Graham Nash and Deniece Williams. "My Romance" was not on the LP or cassette version. "Only One" peaked at number 6 on the US Adult Contemporary chart and at number 3 in Canada.

Reception

Cash Box said that the release of the song "Only One" makes "Taylor breaks no new ground with this single, but his pure voice and beautiful sense of melody and harmony will be welcome." The same magazine said that the title track that it's "a happy celebration of the artist’s years as public property."

Billboard said that "Taylor's calm manner and breezy, light rock melody belie some fairly complex conclusions in this autobiographical statement."

Track listing
All songs were written by James Taylor, except where noted.

Vinyl and Cassette 
Side one
"That's Why I'm Here" – 3:39
"Song for You Far Away" – 2:58
"Only a Dream in Rio" (James Taylor, Jim Maraniss (Portuguese translation)) – 5:01
"Turn Away" – 3:25
"Going Around One More Time" (Livingston Taylor) – 3:27

Side two
"Everyday" (Buddy Holly, Norman Petty) – 3:16
"Limousine Driver" – 3:54
"Only One" – 4:22
"Mona" – 2:51
"(The Man Who Shot) Liberty Valance" (Burt Bacharach, Hal David) – 3:46
"That's Why I'm Here (Reprise)" – 0:29

CD 

 "That's Why I'm Here" – 3:39
 "Song for You Far Away" – 2:58
"Only a Dream in Rio" (James Taylor, Jim Maraniss (Portuguese translation)) – 5:01
"Turn Away" – 3:25
"Going Around One More Time" (Livingston Taylor) – 3:27
"My Romance" (Lorenz Hart, Richard Rodgers) – 2:48 (CD bonus track)
"Everyday" (Buddy Holly, Norman Petty) – 3:16
"Limousine Driver" – 3:54
"Only One" – 4:22
"Mona" – 2:51
"(The Man Who Shot) Liberty Valance" (Burt Bacharach, Hal David) – 3:46
"That's Why I'm Here (Reprise)" – 0:29

Personnel

Musicians

 James Taylor – guitars, lead vocals, backing vocals (1, 2, 4–6, 9, 10)
 Clifford Carter – keyboards (1, 4)
 Don Grolnick – keyboards (1, 8)
 Bill Payne – keyboards (1, 2, 4–10)
 Dan Dugmore – steel guitar (2, 9) guitars (6)
 Jeff Pevar – guitars (4, 7)
 Tony Levin – bass (1-3, 5, 7, 8, 10)
 Leland Sklar – bass (4, 6)
 Russ Kunkel – drums (1-3, 5, 7–10)
 Rick Shlosser – drums (4, 6)
 Jimmy Maelen – percussion (1, 2, 5, 7, 8)
 Airto Moreira – percussion (3)
 Starz Vanderlocket – percussion (4)
 Greg "Fingers" Taylor – harmonica (5, 7)
 David Sanborn – saxophone (1, 7, 10)
 Michael Brecker – saxophone (7)
 Barry Rogers – trombone (7)
 Kenny Kosek – violin (7, 10)
 David Lasley – backing vocals (1, 4, 8)
 Deniece Williams – backing vocals (1)
 Randy Brecker – backing vocals (3), trumpet (7)
 Eliane Elias (credited as Elaine Eliaf) – backing vocals (3)
 Kenia Gould – backing vocals (3)
 Zbeto – backing vocals (3)
 Peter Asher – backing vocals (4)
 Rosemary Butler – backing vocals (4, 6)
 Frank Filipetti – backing vocals (4)
 Arnold McCuller – backing vocals (4, 6)
 Rory Dodd – backing vocals (5)
 Eric Troyer – backing vocals (5)
 Don Henley – backing vocals (8)
 Joni Mitchell – backing vocals (8)
 Graham Nash – backing vocals (9, 10)

Production
 Producers – Frank Filipetti and James Taylor
 Production Assistants – Graham Holmes and Edd Kolakowski 
 Recorded and Mixed by Frank Filipetti 
 Assistant Engineers – Renatta Blauer, Moira Marquis and Billy Miranda.
 Mastered by Ted Jensen at Sterling Sound (New York, NY).
 Art Direction – John Berg
 Front Cover Photo – Andrew Brucker
 Back Cover Photo – Patricia Caulfield

Charts

Weekly charts

Year-end charts

Certifications

References

1985 albums
James Taylor albums
Albums produced by Peter Asher
Albums produced by Frank Filipetti
Columbia Records albums
Albums recorded at MSR Studios
Albums recorded at AIR Studios